Go-Hard is a live album released on November 12, 1996 by the Washington, D.C.-based go-go band Junk Yard Band. The album consists of eleven tracks, including the songs "Tiddy Balls", "JY on the Rise", and "Go-Hard".

Track listing

"Junk's Gettin' Down" – 6:00
"JY Funk"/"Crank That, Pt. 1" – 11:38
"Redrum" – 4:22
"This is the Year (Go-Hard)" – 8:34
"Here Come the Freaks" – 8:42
"Uuuh-Eee-Uhhh"/"Hootie Hootie"  – 4:02
"JY on the Rise (Wink & Dog)"  – 4:52
"Uh-Oh!"  – 5:24
"Tiddy Balls" – 6:48
"(Caught on Tape in the Studio)" – 2:39
"Tiddy Balls" / "Lights Out, Lets Play..." – 7:01

References

External links
Go-Hard at Discogs
Go-Hard at Last.fm
Go-Hard at ARTISTdirect

1996 live albums
Junk Yard Band albums